Sebastian Francis Shaw (born 14 November 1957) is a Pakistani Roman Catholic archbishop. He was born in Padri Jo Goth, Sindh, Pakistan on 14 November 1957. He received his early education at Fatima High School and attended the Government Degree College. He received his religious training under the Order of Friars Minor and at the Christ the King seminary in Karachi and was ordained a priest in Lahore, Pakistan on 6 December 1991. Before joining the Franciscans he was a teacher.

He was rector of the Juniorate and Postulancy of Dar ul Naim Seminary in Lahore from 1991 until 1995, taught at St. Mary's Minor Seminary, Lahore, and has also been Provincial of the Order of Friars Minor in Pakistan.

On 14 February 2009 he was appointed Auxiliary Bishop of Lahore by Pope Benedict XVI. Shaw holds a Master of Science degree in Guidance and Counselling from De La Salle University in Manila.

Shaw was consecrated as bishop at Sacred Heart Cathedral, Lahore, on 25 April 2009. The principal celebrant was the Archbishop of Lahore Lawrence Saldanha, who was assisted by Max John Rodrigues, Bishop of Hyderabad and Joseph Coutts, Bishop of Faisalabad.

On 27 October 2013 Pope Francis appointed Shaw as a member of the Pontifical Council for Interreligious Dialogue.

On 14 November 2013, Pope Francis appointed Bishop Shaw as Archbishop of Lahore.

See also
Portiuncula Friary

References

1957 births
Living people
21st-century Roman Catholic bishops in Pakistan
Pakistani Friars Minor
De La Salle University alumni
Franciscan bishops
Roman Catholic archbishops of Lahore